Simon Slade (born 1982) is an internet entrepreneur from Christchurch, New Zealand. He is the founder and current CEO of the online product-sourcing directory SaleHoo, the affiliate marketing training portal Affilorama, and their parent company Doubledot Media Limited.

Education
In 2003, Slade graduated from Griffith University with a Bachelor of Business Management.

Career
In 2001, Slade began his sales and technology career as a sales representative at Sellagence Limited. He and co-founder Mark Ling each contributed $500 to launch SaleHoo in 2005, which reached 10,000 members eight months after its creation.

In 2006, Slade and Ling launched Affilorama, an affiliate marketing training portal with 230,000 members and over 100 free video lessons. That same year, Slade and Ling also launched Doubledot Media, the parent company of SaleHoo and Affilorama.

Honors
Slade was a Global Operator Finalist at the 2008 Champion Canterbury Awards and an Exporter of the Year Finalist at the 2008 AmCham Export Awards.

References

1982 births
Living people
New Zealand businesspeople
People educated at Christchurch Boys' High School